Charlie Macleod (Charles MacLeod) is an English cricketer. He is a right-handed batsman and a wicketkeeper. He made his first-class debut for Leeds/Bradford MCC University against Yorkshire  on 5 April 2013.

References

External links

1992 births
Living people
English cricketers
Leeds/Bradford MCCU cricketers